Landaverde is a spanish surname of basque origin. Notable people with the surname include:

Gladys Landaverde (born 1990), Salvadoran middle-distance runner
Jorge Suárez Landaverde (1945–1997), Salvadoran footballer
José S. Landaverde (born 1971), Salvadoran community organizer, activist and priest
Karen Elizabeth Landaverde (born 1991), Salvadoran footballer